The Bay of Silence is a 2020 internationally co-produced thriller film directed by Paula van der Oest from a screenplay by Caroline Goodall, based on the 1986 novel of the same name by Lisa St Aubin de Terán. It stars Claes Bang, Olga Kurylenko, Alice Krige, Assaad Bouab and Brian Cox.

Plot

Rosalind and Will live an enviable life in London. She is a celebrated artist, he is a dependable engineer and willing stepfather to her twin eight-year-old daughters. When the difficult birth of their son, Amadeo, rocks Rosalind's carefully calibrated world, she abruptly disappears with her children and the young nanny, Candy. Will suspects a link to a recently arrived suitcase from France, filled with faded photographic negatives.
 
He launches a frantic search across Europe, locating them at the cliff-top Normandy home of Rosalind's dead photographer uncle. But relief turns to horror when he discovers his son has mysteriously died. Hiding in the dilapidated house, Rosalind is too traumatized to recognize him, the twins speak in riddles and Candy has disappeared. A desperate Will sees two options: Report the tragedy and risk his wife being accused of murder or cover it up and protect his family. Unable to believe his wife is culpable, Will secretly buries Amadeo in the dead of night and flees France with his family to a Swiss mountain clinic to help Rosalind recover. When Will confides in her mother, Vivian, she confesses Rosalind's mental instability links to being raped at fourteen. Will reluctantly agrees to a car accident "cover story", orchestrated by her powerful art dealer stepfather, Milton, in order to protect Rosalind.

Rosalind returns home but it is Will who cannot return to "normal". He roams London, secretly investigating the mystery of his wife's past until his obsession and grief drives the vulnerable Rosalind to take refuge with Milton. In a race against time, Will finds the missing Candy who helps him piece together what happened the night his son died and uncovers the identity of the mysterious Pierre Laurent, who holds the key to Rosalind's secrets. When an unarmed Will faces a vengeful Milton, it is Rosalind, in a dramatic twist who decides Milton's fate. Finally, they return to the Bay of Silence in Liguria, Italy, where their story began, to learn if love can conquer all.

Cast
 Claes Bang as Will Walsh
 Olga Kurylenko as Rosalind Palliser
 Brian Cox as Milton Hunter
 Alice Krige as Vivian Palliser
 Assaad Bouab as Pierre Laurent
 Caroline Goodall as Marcia
 Duncan Duff as Curator

Production
In April 2018, it was announced Claes Bang, Olga Kurylenko and Brian Cox had joined the cast of the film, with Paula van der Oest directing from a screenplay by Caroline Goodall, based upon the novel of the same name by Lisa St Aubin de Terán.

Principal photography began in July 2018, in Newcastle upon Tyne, England.

Release
In February 2020, Vertical Entertainment acquired distribution rights to the film in the United States, and Signature Entertainment in the United Kingdom, Australia and New Zealand. The film was released on 14 August 2020 through virtual cinemas and VOD in the United States and Canada, and it also opened in select American cinemas. It will be released on DVD and digital download in the United Kingdom on 28 September 2020.

Critical reception
The Bay of Silence received generally negative reviews from critics. The site's critical consensus reads, "The Bay of Silences committed performances may be enough for thriller fans, but its twist heavy plot adds up to a muddled affair."

References

External links
 
 

2020 films
2020 thriller films
American thriller films
British thriller films
Films based on British novels
Films scored by John Swihart
Films set in Liguria
Films set in London
Films set in Normandy
Films set in Switzerland
Films shot in Tyne and Wear
English-language Italian films
Italian thriller films
Vertical Entertainment films
2020s English-language films
2020s American films
2020s British films